Battles in the North is the third studio album by Norwegian black metal band Immortal. It was released on May 15, 1995 through Osmose Productions. It picks up where its predecessor, Pure Holocaust, left off, featuring extreme tempos, low-fidelity production, and lyrics about coldness or wintery landscapes. This is the first album where the concept of Blashyrkh becomes a central focus. It is the last album to feature Abbath on drums.

Background 
The songs "Cursed Realms of the Winterdemons" and "Circling Above in Time Before Time" reference The Underdark, a setting from Dungeons and Dragons.

Music videos were made for "Blashyrkh (Mighty Ravendark)" and "Grim and Frostbitten Kingdoms", the latter featuring Hellhammer on drums, who also became the band's touring drummer during this period.

Release 
The album was issued in multiple formats, including the standard CD, a limited edition digipak, a limited edition digipak with embossed band logo and album title, cassette tape, a jewel case with slip cover, fold-out poster and bonus tracks taken from the Immortal EP (limited to 3000 copies), and a limited edition LP released under Osmose Productions (re-pressed six times over the years starting in 2005). The artwork on the limited slip cover CD is an original oil painting done by Jeroen van Valkenburg.

Reception 

In 2009, IGN included Battles in the North in their "10 Great Black Metal Albums" list.

Track listing

Misprint
On some editions of this album, most notably on iTunes, many tracks are mislabelled. The songs play in the order shown above, but the song titles are given as follows:

 "Battles in the North"
 "At the Stormy Gates of Mist"
 "Through the Halls of Eternity"
 "Moonrise Fields of Sorrow"
 "Cursed Realms of the Winterdemons"
 "Throned by Blackstorms"
 "Grim and Frostbitten Kingdoms"
 "Descent into Eminent Silence"
 "Circling Above in Time Before Time"
 "Blashyrkh (Mighty Ravendark)"

Personnel 
 Abbath – vocals, drums, bass guitar, production
 Demonaz – guitar, drums, production
 Eirik Hundvin – production

References 

Immortal (band) albums
1995 albums
Osmose Productions albums